Painted Post is a 1928 American silent Western film directed by Eugene Forde and starring Tom Mix, Natalie Kingston and Philo McCullough. It was the final release Mix appeared in for Fox Film, having been one of their biggest stars during the decade.

Cast
 Tom Mix as Tom Blake  
 Natalie Kingston as Barbara Lane  
 Philo McCullough as Ben Tuttle  
 Al St. John as Joe Nimble  
 Fred Gamble as Theatrical Manager

References

Bibliography 
 Jensen, Richard D. The Amazing Tom Mix: The Most Famous Cowboy of the Movies. 2005.

External links 
 

1928 Western (genre) films
Films directed by Eugene Forde
1928 films
American black-and-white films
Fox Film films
Silent American Western (genre) films
1920s English-language films
1920s American films